Progresul may refer to:

FC Progresul București, a football team set in Bucharest and formerly known as FC Naţional București

Geographic entities
 Progresul – quarter of the city of Bucharest
 Progresul – village in Botoşani County, Romania, part of the municipality of Dorohoi

Others
 Progresul (magazine) – magazine published in Bârlad, Romania